Galyukova is a rural locality (a village) in Oshibskoye Rural Settlement, Kudymkarsky District, Perm Krai, Russia. The population was 23 as of 2010.

Geography 
Galyukova is located 48 km northeast of Kudymkar (the district's administrative centre) by road. Melekhina is the nearest rural locality.

References 

Rural localities in Kudymkarsky District